Ang Leon, ang Tigre at ang Alamid  is a 1979 Philippine action film directed by Cesar Gallardo. The film stars Rudy Fernandez, Bembol Roco and Lito Lapid as their respective title roles.

The film is streaming online on YouTube.

Cast
Rudy Fernandez
Bembol Roco
Lito Lapid
Tina Monasterio
Gina Alajar
Josephine Manuel
Paquito Diaz
Johnny Wilson

References

External links

Full Movie on Regal Entertainment

1979 films
1979 action films
Filipino-language films
Philippine action films
Regal Entertainment films